The list of shipwrecks in November 1939 includes ships sunk, foundered, grounded, or otherwise lost during November 1939.

1 November

3 November

4 November

6 November

9 November

10 November

12 November

13 November

14 November

15 November

16 November

17 November

18 November

19 November

20 November

21 November

 (Look 10/12/1939)

22 November

23 November

24 November

25 November

26 November

27 November

28 November

29 November

30 November

Unknown date

References

1939-11